Tenor Legacy may refer to the following jazz albums:
Tenor Legacy (Joe Lovano album), 1993
Tenor Legacy (Benny Golson album), 1996